Maria Bogucka (June 1, 1929 – October 27, 2020) was a Polish historian, science popularizer professor, dr.hab., and former professor at the Faculty of Polish Philology Pułtusk Academy of Humanities, Pułtusk, Poland. She authored over 40 books.

She graduated from the University of Warsaw in 1951, obtaining her doctorate there in 1956 and the title of professor of humanities in 1981. In 2007 she was awarded Doctor honoris causa by the University of Gdańsk for her "outstanding contribution to the knowledge of the history of Gdańsk and the Republic of Poland, especially of modern times, and shaping the development of modern historical science".

She is buried at the Northern Communal Cemetery in Warsaw.

Awards and decorations
2007: City of Gdańsk President's Medal
1992: Officer's Cross of the Order of Polonia Restituta
1986: Knight's Cross of the Order of Polonia Restituta
1977, 1999: "Meritorious to Gdańsk Land" badge, for her research in economic history of Gdańsk
1974: Golden Cross of Merit

References

1929 births
2020 deaths
20th-century Polish historians
University of Warsaw alumni
20th-century Polish women writers
Polish women historians